Prof. Dr. P. Ramasamy s/o Palanisamy (born 10 May 1949) is a Malaysian politician who has served as the Deputy Chief Minister of Penang II and Member of the Penang State Executive Council (EXCO) in the Pakatan Rakyat (PR) and Pakatan Harapan (PH) state administrations under Chief Ministers Lim Guan Eng and Chow Kon Yeow and Member of the Penang State Legislative Assembly for Perai (MLA) since March 2008. He served as Member of Parliament (MP) for Batu Kawan from March 2008 to May 2013. He is a member of the Democratic Action Party (DAP), a component party of the PH and formerly PR coalitions. His vocal opinions on Zakir Naik, support for the Government of India under Narendra Modi and reforms of the civil service in Malaysia due to its Malay dominance have been controversial.

Ramasamy was elected to the Malaysian Parliament and Penang State Legislative Assembly in the 2008 election, defeating former Penang Chief Minister Koh Tsu Koon. He became Deputy Chief Minister of Penang after the election, serving under the new Chief Minister Lim Guan Eng, making him the first person of Indian origin to hold the post of deputy chief minister in any Malaysian state.

Before entering politics, Ramasamy was a professor at the Universiti Kebangsaan Malaysia (UKM), from which he officially retired in May 2005. He later took up teaching positions in Germany and Singapore.

Background
Ramasamy was born on May 10, 1949. His father Palaniyammal Palanichany and his mother worked in the fields of Malaya in 1920 and migrated from Tamil Nadu. He has six siblings. Ramasamy attended the Anglo-China Primary School in the late 1950s.

He earned his early education in Teluk Intan, Perak, then obtained a First Degree in Journalism in New Zealand then continued his studies in Political Science at Indian University United States (1977) and at master's degree in McGill University, Canada (1980) then obtained a PhD at University of Malaya in 1991. He served as a lecturer from 1981 to 2005 at Universiti Kebangsaan Malaysia (UKM) in Political Science.

Career
He has served as the University of Singapore's Visiting Professor in Southeast Asian Political Education. From the beginning, he has been involved as an activist working on issues of labor beginning in the 1980s through INSAN (Institute of Social Analysis) Kuala Lumpur.

He has had 25 years of experience as a political science lecturer, who has served as a counselor and security consultant to several international peace efforts such as Acheh, Sri Lanka, the Philippines and Colombia. Ramasamy served as an advisor to the Global Labor University International Labour Organization (ILO) 2004.

Political career
Ramasamy is active as an activist who fights for the fate of minorities in Sri Lanka and Acheh Merdeka. The two parties involved in Acheh finally agreed to sign a peace agreement on August 5, 2005. On 26 August 2005 he was fired from UKM for no reason. Afterwards he taught in Germany and Singapore and began to engage in DAP activities.

Started joining DAP officially in September 2005. Writing several books and many articles in local and international journals. He defeated former Chief Minister of Penang Tan Sri Koh Tsu Koon for the Batu Kawan parliamentary constituency in the 2008 general election. He is also Penang State Assemblyman N16 Perai. In 2008, the BN government fell to PR as DAP had won 19 seats, PKR 9 seats and PAS only 1 seat. He was appointed Deputy Chief Minister II of Penang and was the first Indian to be elected to the post.

In the exco of the Penang government, he is responsible for state economic planning, education and human resources, science, technology and innovation.

Controversies

Zakir Naik 
On 10 April 2016, P Ramasamy, called prominent Islamic preacher Dr. Zakir Naik as "satan", he wrote in his Facebook post "Let us get ‘satan’ Zakir Naik out of this country!". After severe backlash he removed his posting, apologized and said sorry for causing uneasiness and unhappiness among Muslims in Malaysia.

India's Hindu Nationalism policies under Narendra Modi 
During October 2019, on the internationally objected event of the military lockdown of Kashmir (region in India known for military excesses) during Jammu and Kashmir reorganization, P Ramasamy criticized the then Malaysian Prime Minister Mahathir for expressing his concern at the United Nations to restore the human rights situation in Kashmir. On the one year anniversary of Kashmir's special status revocation, Mahathir stated that as he was no longer the premier, he could "speak without restrain and address the Kashmir issue", noting the backlash his previous statements had caused; Offering no apology for his criticism, Mahathir added that "keeping quiet is not an option when all the telltale signs were pointing towards another situation whereby a big and powerful country imposed its will with impunity on a small and defenseless nation."

During December 2019, despite global condemnation by many leaders and human rights organizations on India's Citizenship Amendment Act (designed for addressing the bordering Muslim majority countries only), the detention camp deaths due to NRC and the deaths during the protests against the Act; P Ramasamy had a series of articles defending the requirement of the Act and had TV appearances in Indian media criticizing Mahathir for commenting on the India's Citizenship Amendment Act and the deaths caused (during protests and in detention camp for lack of ancestral documents). Hafiz Hassan, had questioned "Is P Ramasamy a state assembly person from Malaysia or an official from India's External Affairs Ministry?" on why he is so apologetic of the citizenship policy of India, despite Sri Lankan Tamil refugees in India would be affected as well.

Election results

References

External links
Makkal Osai turned Ramasamy’s Apologist
What has Mahathir got against India?
Dr M may have misunderstood new Indian citizenship law
Dr M backs secular principles only when Muslims are minorities

Living people
1949 births
People from Perak
Malaysian people of Tamil descent
Malaysian politicians of Indian descent
Democratic Action Party (Malaysia) politicians
Members of the Dewan Rakyat
Members of the Penang State Legislative Assembly
Penang state executive councillors
Academic staff of the National University of Malaysia
Indiana University alumni
McGill University alumni
University of Malaya alumni
21st-century Malaysian politicians